is a railway freight terminal operated by Japan Freight Railway Company (JR Freight) located in the Yashio district of Shinagawa, Tokyo, east of Omori and north of Haneda Airport. 

It is the largest rail freight terminal in Japan and principally handles freight traffic to and from western Japan via the Tōkaidō Main Line. A number of companies operate dedicated logistics facilities at the station, including Yamato Transport, Sagawa Express, Nippon Express, and Kintetsu World Express. 

The terminal is adjacent to the Tōkaidō Shinkansen Tokyo Depot. The closest passenger station is Ryūtsū Center Station on the Tokyo Monorail. The branch line on which the terminal is situated also originally extended from Tokyo Freight Terminal up to the Shiodome Freight Terminal (the site of the original Shimbashi Station) until its closure in 1986.

Latitude and longitude of Tokyo Freight Terminal 
   Latitude: 35° 35' 26.99" N
   Longitude: 139° 45' 16.79" E

GPS Coordinates of Tokyo Freight Terminal

Gallery

History
Tokyo Freight Terminal opened on 1 October 1973.The station was absorbed into the JR Freight network upon the privatization of JNR on 1 April 1987.

Surrounding area
 Japan Freight Railway (JR Freight)  Central Training Center
 Central Japan Railway Company (JR Central) Tokyo Alternate inspection vehicle station
 Rinkai Line Torin Vehicle Station
 Tokyo Monorail Ryutsu Center Station

References

External links

Railway stations in Tokyo
Stations of Japan Freight Railway Company
Tōkaidō Main Line
Railway freight terminals in Japan
Railway stations in Japan opened in 1973